= Coronel Meira =

Brazilian military police officer and politician (born 1958)

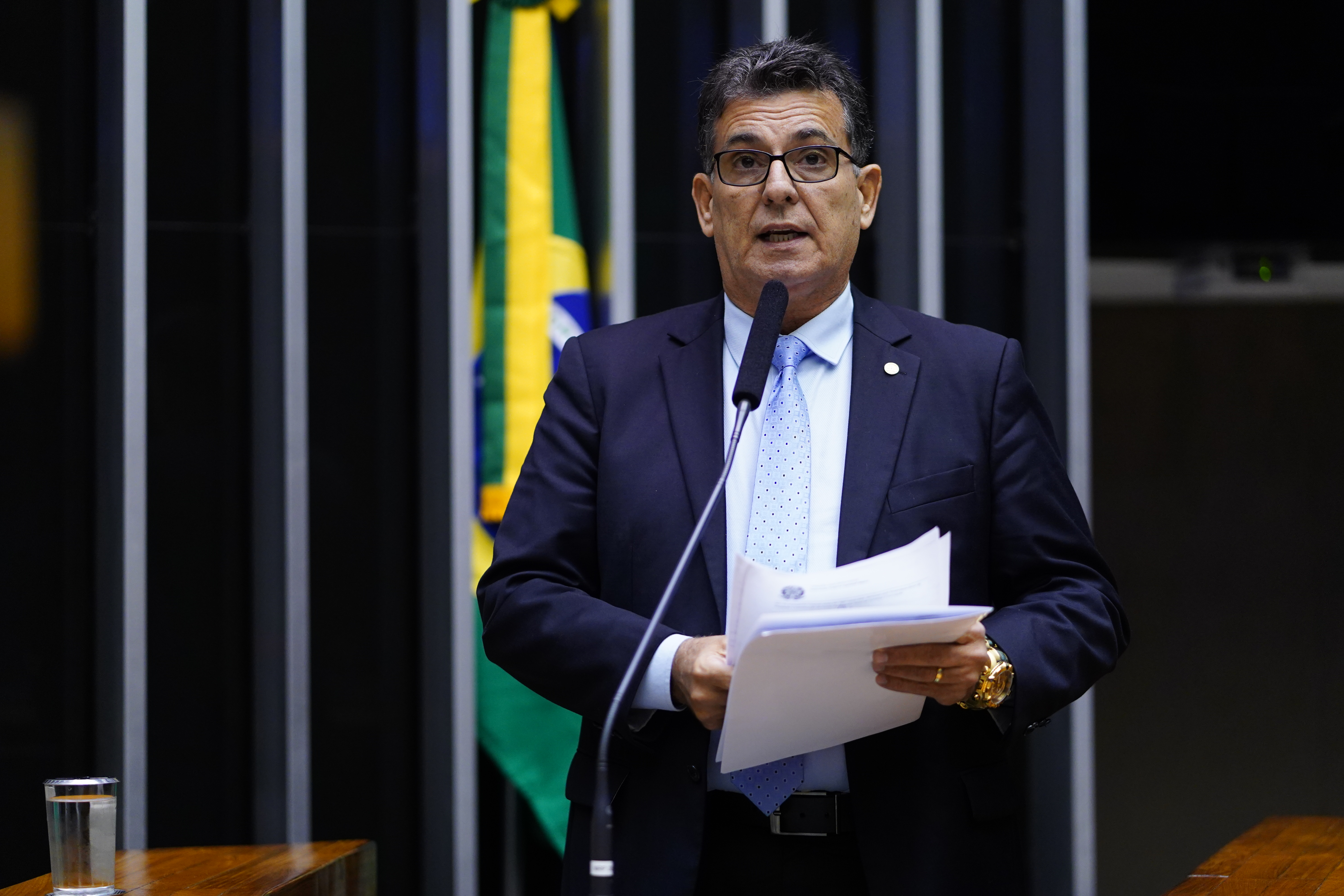
Coronel Meira

Luiz de Franca e Silva Meira (born January 7, 1958, in Recife), better known as Coronel Meira, is a Brazilian military police officer and politician, affiliated with the Liberal Party (PL).

He got elected with 78,941 votes as federal deputy for Pernambuco in 2022.
